The Rhapsody Tapes is the debut studio album by Australian nu metal band Ocean Grove. it was released on 3 February 2017 through UNFD Records. Their first single "These Boys Light Fires" was released on 1 December 2016.  followed by another single "Intimate Alien" which was released on 21 December 2016 along with the music video for the single and the pre-order for the album. The album reached #5 on the ARIA Albums Chart in its first week of release, and was selected as a "Feature Album" by Australian radio station Triple J almost two weeks ahead of the album's release.

Critical reception

The Rhapsody Tapes received critical acclaim upon release. Jonty Simmons of Hysteria Magazine was very positive about the album, giving it a perfect score of 10 and stating "The Rhapsody Tapes solidifies their position atop the pile of DIY wunderkinds. When the rest of us have already teleported to their dimension of hyperreality, those who refuse to give it a chance will regret not jumping on the ship earlier". Alex Sievers of KillYourStereo gave the album a score of 94 (out of 100) and stated that the band "has challenged the preconceived notions of their art and music from both fans and detractors alike" and also stating that the album is "not only crammed full of new classics but is also their best work yet".

Commercial performance
On the chart dated 13 February 2017, The Rhapsody Tapes debuted at number on the ARIA Albums Chart at number 5. The following week, the album fell into the lower fifty. On the chart dated 14 February 2022, The Rhapsody Tapes re-entered the ARIA Albums Chart at number 94, five years after its initial peak.

Track listing

Personnel
 Luke Holmes – lead vocals 
 Dale Tanner – bass, vocals
 Matthew Henley – guitars
 Jimmy Hall – guitars
 Sam Bassal – drums, production, engineered, mastering, mixing
 Matthew Kopp (aka Running Touch) – samples, keyboards, vocals, production, engineered, mastering, mixing

Charts

References

2017 debut albums
Ocean Grove (Australian band) albums
UNFD albums